Fright Night is a 2011 American supernatural horror comedy film directed by Craig Gillespie and produced by Michael De Luca and Alison Rosenzweig. A remake of Tom Holland's 1985 film, the film's screenplay was adapted by Marti Noxon. It stars Anton Yelchin, Colin Farrell, Toni Collette, Imogen Poots, Christopher Mintz-Plasse, and David Tennant. The plot follows a teenaged boy who discovers that his neighbor is actually a vampire, which culminates in a battle between the two. The film held its world premiere at The O2 in London on August 14, 2011. It was released in the United States by Touchstone Pictures on August 19, 2011, in RealD 3D.

Upon its release, Fright Night grossed $41 million against a production budget of $30 million. It received generally positive reviews, with many praising its humor and performances, notably Farrell.

Plot 
Charley Brewster is a teenager living in a suburb of Las Vegas, Nevada, who discovers that a new neighbor has moved in next door. Charley's old best friend, Edward "Evil Ed" Lee, informs him that many students have gone missing, including their other childhood friend, Adam Johnson. When Charley goes home after school, his mother, Jane, introduces him to Jerry Dandrige, their new neighbor. Fed-up and angry with Ed after he claims that Jerry is a vampire, Charley tells him that he is crazy and that he does not want to be friends anymore.

On his way home, Ed is confronted by Jerry, who claims that he has been watching Ed and has been aware of Ed watching him. Jerry soon chases Ed into a nearby pool and convinces him into believing that his life would be much better if he were a vampire. Ed succumbs and willingly allows Jerry to bite him. The next day, Charley realizes that Ed is missing and decides to investigate, starting to believe Ed's claims when he discovers video recordings of objects moving on their own, with Ed's voiceover revealing that he is recording Jerry to prove that his reflection does not show up in recordings. As Jerry begins to attack more people throughout the neighborhood, Charley sneaks into Jerry's house and finds out that he keeps his victims in secret rooms. Charley goes to Las Vegas magician Peter Vincent, a supposed expert on vampires. Peter, however, does not take him seriously and kicks him out.

Jerry comes to Charley's house and sets fire to it. Charley, Jane, and his girlfriend, Amy Peterson, flee through the desert in their minivan. Jerry catches up with them but is wounded by Jane with a real estate sign stake. Jane is admitted to a hospital, where Charley is summoned by Peter who recognized the sigil from Jerry's house. Upon arriving at Peter's penthouse, they are informed that the species of vampire Jerry belongs to is cannibalistic when Ed turns up. By now, Ed has been fully transformed into a vampire and he aids Jerry in attacking Charley, Amy, and Peter. As they fight, Ed let's all of his anger out on his opponent and Charley reluctantly kills Ed. Meanwhile, Amy shoots Jerry with silver bullets, which are rather ineffective, but then injures Jerry with holy water. They then run into a club, where they get separated in the crowd. Amy is kissed and bitten by Jerry, who proceeds to take her.

Peter refuses to help Charley and reveals that both of his parents were killed by a vampire (later revealed to be Jerry himself). He does, however, give Charley a stake blessed by Saint Michael that will kill Jerry and turn all of his victims back into humans. Charley goes to Jerry's house, where Peter decides to join him after all.

They are led into Jerry's basement, where they are attacked by many of Jerry's victims, including Amy. Charley confronts Amy and she explains how they can be with each other forever. Just as she is about to bite Charley, he stabs her, intentionally missing her heart, and then escaping. Meanwhile, Peter is ambushed by Jerry and many of his victims. Peter is able to kill a few before his weapon backfires. Charley returns to the basement, only to see Peter being fed on by the remaining vampires. He decides to shoot holes in the roof, from which sunlight shines in and kills them. The patch of sunlight guards both Charley and Peter from the vampires who had not been destroyed. Jerry appears, explaining that Charley's quest is, in fact, over. Charley, having outfitted himself in a flame-retardant suit, has Peter light him on fire and tackles Jerry just as Amy is feeding on him. A struggle between the two ensues while the other vampires watch. Peter assists him by shooting another hole in the floor above to allow more sunlight in. This burns Jerry, and Peter tosses Charley the stake he had dropped. Charley quickly stabs Jerry in his visible heart, killing him, and returning his victims to their human form. Afterwards, Charley's mother recovers in the hospital and goes to shop for a new house as Charley and Amy have sex in Peter's penthouse.

Cast 
 Anton Yelchin as Charley Brewster
 Colin Farrell as Jerry
 Christopher Mintz-Plasse as Edward “Evil Ed” Lee
 David Tennant as Peter Vincent
 Imogen Poots as Amy Peterson
 Toni Collette as Jane Brewster
 Dave Franco as Mark
 Reid Ewing as Ben
 Will Denton as Adam Johnson
 Sandra Vergara as Ginger
 Emily Montague As Doris
 Lisa Loeb as Victoria Lee
 Brian Huskey as Rick Lee
 Grace Phipps as Bee
 Dee Bradley Baker as Vampires (vocals)

Chris Sarandon, who portrayed Jerry in the original film, makes a cameo appearance as a motorist killed by the vampire (his character is credited as "Jay Dee", after the initials of his original character).

Production 
Principal photography of Charley, Ed and Jerry's houses and neighborhood began in Rio Rancho, New Mexico, a suburb Northwest of Albuquerque, New Mexico, the scenes of Peter Vincent on stage were shot at the National Hispanic Cultural Center in Albuquerque, New Mexico and the scenes involving the Hard Rock Casino, Las Vegas were actually shot at the now defunct Hard Rock Casino, Isleta, New Mexico, with Las Vegas set as the backdrop on July 26, 2010, and wrapped on October 1, 2010. Fright Night was produced by DreamWorks Pictures and distributed worldwide by Walt Disney Studios Motion Pictures through the Touchstone Pictures label. The film was the first of two collaborations between Anton Yelchin and Imogen Poots, with the second and final being Green Room.

Steven Spielberg provided a great deal of input in the making of the film, such as storyboarding scenes and assistance with editing.

Soundtrack 

Ramin Djawadi composed the score to the film.

Track listing 
All music by Ramin Djawadi.

Release 
Although the film received a wide release in the United States on August 19, 2011, an advance screening took place at San Diego Comic-Con International on July 22, 2011.

Home media 
The film was released by Touchstone Home Entertainment on Blu-ray Disc, Blu-ray 3D, DVD, and digital download on December 13, 2011. The release was produced in three different physical packages: a 3-disc combo pack (Blu-ray 3D, Blu-ray, and DVD with Digital Copy); a 2-disc combo pack (Blu-ray Disc and DVD); and a one-disc DVD. The film was also released digitally in 3D, high definition, and standard definition. The DVD version will include the "Gag Reel" and "Squid Man – Extended and Uncut" bonus features, as well as an uncensored music video for Kid Cudi's song "No One Believes Me". The digital download version will include the same features as the DVD version, plus "Live in Las Vegas: An Interview with Peter Vincent" and "The Official 'How to Make a Funny Vampire Movie' Guide" bonus features. Both the 2-disc and 3-disc combo packs will include five deleted scenes with introductions by director Gillespie, a gag reel, an uncensored music video for "No One Believes Me", "Squid Man – Extended & Uncut", "Peter Vincent: Swim Inside My Mind", "The Official 'How to Make a Funny Vampire Movie' Guide" and "Frightful Facts & Terrifying Trivia" bonus features.

Reception

Critical response 
Review aggregator Rotten Tomatoes gave the film an approval rating of 72% based on 178 reviews, and an average rating of 6.28/10. The site's critical consensus reads, "It may not have been necessary to remake the 1985 cult classic, but the new Fright Night benefits from terrific performances by Colin Farrell and David Tennant – and it's smart, funny, and stylishly gory to boot." On Metacritic, which assigns a weighted average score out to reviews from mainstream critics, gives the film a score of 64 out of 100, based on 30 critics, indicating "generally favorable reviews". CinemaScore polls reported that the average grade moviegoers gave the film was a "B−" on an A+ to F scale.

Robert Koehler of Variety writes, Fright Night has "a cleverly balanced mix of scares and laughs".

Box office 
Fright Night opened in number six in the box office. The film grossed $7,714,388 in its opening weekend and finished with a domestic grossing of $18,302,607 and $22,700,000 in other countries, giving a worldwide total of $41,002,607 against its $30 million budget.

Accolades

Homage sequel 
A straight-to-video homage sequel titled Fright Night 2: New Blood was filmed in Romania. It stars Will Payne, Jaime Murray, Sean Power, Sacha Parkinson, and Chris Waller. The film was released direct to DVD on October 1, 2013. Though billed as a sequel, the film repeats the plot of the original and remake, with none of the 2011 cast, and no reference is made to events in the previous film (for example, the character of Evil Ed, killed in Fright Night, is alive in the "sequel").

See also 
 Vampire film
 List of films set in Las Vegas

Notes

References

External links 
 
 
 
 
 

2011 films
2011 3D films
2011 comedy horror films
2010s English-language films
2010s teen horror films
American 3D films
American comedy horror films
American teen horror films
Comedy film remakes
DreamWorks Pictures films
Films directed by Craig Gillespie
Films produced by Michael De Luca
Films scored by Ramin Djawadi
Films set in the Las Vegas Valley
Films shot in New Mexico
Films with screenplays by Marti Noxon
Fright Night (franchise)
Horror film remakes
Reliance Entertainment films
Remakes of American films
Teen film remakes
Touchstone Pictures films
2010s American films